Major-General Mervyn Janes  (1 October 1920 – 7 December 2008) was a British Army officer who commanded 5th Division.

Military career
Educated at Sir Walter St John's Grammar School For Boys, Janes was commissioned into the Royal Artillery in 1942 during World War II. He was appointed Commander, Royal Artillery in 1965, Deputy Military Secretary in 1967 and General Officer Commanding 5th Division in 1970 before becoming Director Royal Artillery in 1971. As Director Royal Artillery he visited Oman during the closing stages of the operation to remove communist forces following the Dhofar Rebellion. He retired in 1973.

References

1920 births
2008 deaths
British Army major generals
Royal Artillery officers
Companions of the Order of the Bath
Members of the Order of the British Empire
People educated at Sir Walter St John's Grammar School For Boys
British Army personnel of World War II
British military personnel of the Dhofar Rebellion